This list attempts to include all plants which generate coal power in Turkey including autoproducers. All coal-fired power stations which sent power to the grid in 2020 are listed below. In 2018 there were 300 MW of unlicensed thermal power stations (a licence is not required if no power is sent to the grid) but it is not known whether any of them were coal-fired.

Coal-fired power stations

See also 

 Electricity sector in Turkey#Future
 Energy policy of Turkey
 Greenhouse gas emissions by Turkey
 Environmental issues in Turkey
 List of active coal-fired power stations in the United Kingdom

Notes

References

Sources

See also
 :Category:Coal mines in Turkey

External links
 Map of coal plants by Global Energy Monitor
 Map of European coal plants including Turkey by Beyond Coal
 Graph of owners etc.
 List from Openstreetmap

Turkey
Power stations, coal
 
Turkey